Sir William Gerald Golding  (19 September 1911 – 19 June 1993) was a British novelist, playwright, and poet. Best known for his debut novel Lord of the Flies (1954), he published another twelve volumes of fiction in his lifetime. In 1980, he was awarded the Booker Prize for Rites of Passage,  the first novel in what became his sea trilogy, To the Ends of the Earth. He was awarded the 1983 Nobel Prize in Literature.

As a result of his contributions to literature, Golding was knighted in 1988. He was a fellow of the Royal Society of Literature. In 2008, The Times ranked Golding third on its list of "The 50 greatest British writers since 1945".

Biography

Early life

William Golding was born in his maternal grandmother's house, 47 Mount Wise, Newquay, Cornwall. The house was known as Karenza, the Cornish word for love, and he spent many childhood holidays there. He grew up in Marlborough, Wiltshire, where his father, Alec Golding, was a science master at Marlborough Grammar School (1905 to retirement), the school the young Golding and his elder brother Joseph attended. His mother, Mildred (Curnoe), kept house at 29, The Green, Marlborough, and was a campaigner for female suffrage. Golding's mother, who was Cornish and whom he considered "a superstitious Celt", used to tell him old Cornish ghost stories from her own childhood. In 1930 Golding went to Brasenose College, Oxford, where he read Natural Sciences for two years before transferring to English for his final two years. His original tutor was the chemist Thomas Taylor. In a private journal and in a memoir for his wife he admitted having tried to rape a teenage girl during a vacation. 

Golding took his B.A. degree with Second Class Honours in the summer of 1934, and later that year a book of his Poems was published by Macmillan & Co, with the help of his Oxford friend, the anthroposophist Adam Bittleston.

In 1935 he took a job teaching English at Michael Hall School, a Steiner-Waldorf school then in 
Streatham, South London, staying there two years
. After a year in Oxford studying for a Diploma of Education, he was a schoolmaster teaching English and music at Maidstone Grammar School 1938 – 1940, before moving to Bishop Wordsworth's School, Salisbury, in April 1940. There he taught English, Philosophy, Greek, and drama until joining the navy on 18 December 1940, reporting for duty at HMS Raleigh. He returned in 1945 and taught the same subjects until 1961.

Golding kept a personal journal for over 22 years  from 1971 until the night before his death, and which contained approximately 2.4 million words in total. The journal was initially used by Golding in order to record his dreams, but over time it gradually began to function as a record of his life. The journals contained insights including retrospective thoughts about his novels and memories from his past. At one point Golding described setting his students up into two groups to fight each other – an experience he drew on when writing Lord of the Flies. John Carey, the emeritus professor of English literature at Oxford university, was eventually given 'unprecedented access to Golding's unpublished papers and journals by the Golding estate'. Though Golding had not written the journals specifically so that a biography could be written about him, Carey published William Golding: The Man Who Wrote Lord of the Flies in 2009.

Marriage and family
Golding was engaged to Molly Evans, a woman from Marlborough, who was well liked by both of his parents. However, he broke off the engagement and married Ann Brookfield, an analytical chemist, on 30 September 1939. They had two children, David (born September 1940) and Judith (born July 1945).

War service
During World War II, Golding joined the Royal Navy in 1940. He served on a destroyer which was briefly involved in the pursuit and sinking of the German battleship Bismarck. Golding participated in the invasion of Normandy on D-Day, commanding a landing craft that fired salvoes of rockets onto the beaches. He was also in action at Walcheren in October and November 1944, during which time 10 out of 27 assault craft that went into the attack were sunk.

"Crisis"
Golding had a troubled relationship with alcohol; Judy Carver notes that her father was "always very open, if rueful, about problems with drink". Golding suggested that his self-described "crisis", of which alcoholism played a major part, had plagued him his entire life. John Carey mentions several instances of binge drinking in his biography, including Golding's experiences in 1963; whilst on holiday in Greece (when he was meant to have been finishing his novel The Spire), after working on his writing in the morning, he would go to his preferred "Kapheneion" to drink at midday. By the evening would move onto ouzo and brandy; he developed a reputation locally for "provoking explosions".

Unfortunately, the eventual publication of The Spire the following year did not help Golding's developing struggle with alcohol; it had precisely the opposite effect, with the novel's scathingly negative reviews in a BBC radio broadcast affecting him severely. Following the publication of The Pyramid in 1967, Golding experienced a severe writer's block: the result of myriad crises (family anxieties, insomnia, and a general sense of dejection). Golding eventually became unable to deal with what he perceived to be the intense reality of his life without first drinking copious amounts of alcohol. Tim Kendall suggests that these experiences manifest in Golding's writing as the character Wilf in The Paper Men; "an ageing novelist whose alcohol-sodden journeys across Europe are bankrolled by the continuing success of his first book".

By the late 1960s, Golding was relying on alcohol – which he referred to as "the old, old anodyne". His first steps towards recovery came from his study of Carl Jung's writings, and in what he called "an admission of discipleship" he travelled to Switzerland in 1971 to see Jung's landscapes for himself. That same year, he started keeping a journal in which he recorded and interpreted his dreams; the last entry is from the day before he died, in 1993, and the volumes-long work came to be thousands of pages long by this time.

The crisis did inevitably affect Golding's output, and his next novel, Darkness Visible, would be published twelve years after The Pyramid; a far cry from the prolific author who had produced six novels in thirteen years since the start of his career. Despite this, the extent of Golding's recovery is evident from the fact that this was only the first of six further novels that Golding completed before his death.

Death
In 1985, Golding and his wife moved to a house called Tullimaar in Perranarworthal, near Truro, Cornwall. He died of heart failure eight years later on 19 June 1993. His body was buried in the parish churchyard of Bowerchalke near his former home and the Wiltshire county border with Hampshire and Dorset.

On his death he left the draft of a novel, The Double Tongue, set in ancient Delphi, which was published posthumously in 1995.

Career

Writing success

Whilst still a teacher at Bishop Wordsworth's School, in 1951 Golding began writing a manuscript of the novel initially titled Strangers from Within. 

In September 1953, after rejections from seven other publishers, Golding sent a manuscript to Faber and Faber and was initially rejected by their reader, Jan Perkins, who labelled it as "Rubbish & dull. Pointless". His book, however, was championed by Charles Monteith, a new editor at the firm. Monteith asked for some changes to the text and the novel was published in September 1954 as Lord of the Flies.

After moving in 1958 from Salisbury to nearby Bowerchalke, he met his fellow villager and walking companion James Lovelock. The two discussed Lovelock's hypothesis, that the living matter of the planet Earth functions like a single organism, and Golding suggested naming this hypothesis after Gaia, the personification of the Earth in Greek mythology, and mother of the Titans. His publishing success made it possible for Golding to resign his teaching post at Bishop Wordsworth's School in 1961, and he spent that academic year in the United States as writer-in-residence at Hollins College (now Hollins University), near Roanoke, Virginia.

Golding won the James Tait Black Memorial Prize for Darkness Visible in 1979, and the Booker Prize for Rites of Passage in 1980. In 1983, he was awarded the Nobel Prize for Literature, and was according to the Oxford Dictionary of National Biography "an unexpected and even contentious choice".

In 1988, Golding was appointed a Knight Bachelor. In September 1993, only a few months after his unexpected death, the First International William Golding Conference was held in France.

Fiction
His first novel, Lord of the Flies (1954; film, 1963 and 1990; play, adapted by Nigel Williams, 1995), describes a group of boys stranded on a tropical island descending into a lawless and increasingly wild existence before being rescued. The Inheritors (1955) depicts a tribe of gentle Neanderthals encountering modern humans, who by comparison are deceitful and violent. His 1956 novel Pincher Martin records the thoughts of a drowning sailor. Free Fall (1959) explores the issue of freedom of choice. The novel's narrator, a World War Two soldier in a German POW Camp, endures interrogation and solitary confinement. After these events and while recollecting the experiences, he looks back over the choices he has made, trying to trace precisely where he lost the freedom to make his own decisions. The Spire (1964) follows the construction (and near collapse) of an impossibly large spire on the top of a medieval cathedral (generally assumed to be Salisbury Cathedral).  

Golding's 1967 novel, The Pyramid, consists of three linked stories with a shared setting in a small English town based partly on Marlborough where Golding grew up. The Scorpion God (1971) contains three novellas, the first set in an ancient Egyptian court ("The Scorpion God"); the second describing a prehistoric African hunter-gatherer group ("Clonk, Clonk"); and the third in the court of a Roman emperor ("Envoy Extraordinary"). The last of these, originally published in 1956, was reworked by Golding into a play, The Brass Butterfly, in 1958. From 1971 to 1979, Golding published no novels. After this period he published Darkness Visible (1979): a story involving terrorism, paedophilia, and a mysterious figure who survives a fire in the Blitz, and appears to have supernatural powers. In 1980, Golding published Rites of Passage, the first of his novels about a voyage to Australia in the early nineteenth century. The novel won the Booker Prize in 1980 and Golding followed this success with Close Quarters (1987) and Fire Down Below (1989) to complete his 'sea trilogy', later published as one volume entitled To the Ends of the Earth. In 1984, he published The Paper Men: an account of the struggles between a novelist and his would-be biographer.

List of works

Poetry
Poems (1934)

Drama
The Brass Butterfly (1958)

Novels
Lord of the Flies (1954) 
The Inheritors (1955)
Pincher Martin (1956)
Free Fall (1959)
The Spire (1964)
The Pyramid (1967)
Darkness Visible (1979) (James Tait Black Memorial Prize)
To the Ends of the Earth (trilogy)
Rites of Passage (1980) (Booker Prize)
Close Quarters (1987)
Fire Down Below (1989)
The Paper Men (1984)
The Double Tongue (posthumous publication 1995)

Collections
The Scorpion God (1971)
"The Scorpion God"
"Clonk Clonk"
"Envoy Extraordinary"

Non-fiction
The Hot Gates (1965)
A Moving Target (1982)
An Egyptian Journal (1985)

Unpublished works
Seahorse was written in 1948. It is a biographical account of sailing on the south coast of England in the summer of 1947 and contains a short passage about being in training for D-Day.
Circle Under the Sea is an adventure novel about a writer who sails to discover archaeological treasures off the coast of the Scilly Isles.
Short Measure is a novel set in a British school akin to Bishop Wordsworth's.

Audiobooks 
 2005: Lord of the Flies (read by the author), Listening Library,

Citations

General and cited sources 
 
 
Kendall, Tim. "William Golding's Great Dream." Essays in Criticism, Vol. 68, Issue. 4, October 2018, pp. 466–487. Oxford Academic (Website), https://academic.oup.com/eic/article-abstract/68/4/466/5126810?redirectedFrom=PDF. Accessed 3 June 2021.

Further reading
 Crompton, Donald. A View from the Spire: William Golding's Later Novels. Basil Blackwell Publisher Ltd, Oxford, 1985. https://archive.org/details/viewfromspirew00crom/page/n5/mode/2up. .
 L. L. Dickson. The Modern Allegories of William Golding (University of South Florida Press, 1990). .
 R. A. Gekoski and P. A. Grogan, William Golding: A Bibliography, London, André Deutsch, 1994. .
 Golding, Judy. The Children of Lovers. Faber & Faber, 2012. .
 Gregor, Ian and Kinkead-Weekes, Mark. William Golding: A critical Study. 2nd Revised Edition, Faber & Faber, 1984. 
 McCarron, Kevin. (2007) 'From Psychology to Ontology: William Golding's Later Fiction.' In: MacKay M., Stonebridge L. (eds) British Fiction After Modernism. Palgrave Macmillan, London. https://doi.org/10.1057/9780230801394_15.
 McCarron, Kevin. William Golding (Writers and Their Work). 2nd Edition, Northcote House Publishers Ltd, 2006. .
 "Boys Armed with Sticks: William Golding's Lord of the Flies". Chapter in B. Schoene-Harwood. Writing Men. Edinburgh University Press, 2000.
 Tiger, Virginia. William Golding: The Dark Fields of Discovery. Marion Boyars Publishers Ltd, 1974. .
 Tiger, Virginia. William Golding: The Unmoved Target. Marion Boyars Publishers Ltd, 2003. 
 Ladenthin, Volker: Golding, Herr der Fliegen; Verne, 2 Jahre Ferien; Schlüter, Level 4 – Stadt der Kinder. In: engagement (1998) H. 4 S. 271–274.

External links

 BBC television interview from 1959
 
 Interview by Mary Lynn Scott – Universal Pessimist, Cosmic Optimist
 William Golding Ltd Official Website.
 Last Words An account of Golding's last evening by D. M. Thomas – Guardian – Saturday 10 June 2006 (Review Section)
 Official Facebook page
 Nobel Prize Lecture
 "William Golding's crisis"
 
 William Golding at University of Exeter Special Collections

1911 births
1993 deaths
20th-century British dramatists and playwrights
20th-century English novelists
20th-century English poets
Alumni of Brasenose College, Oxford
Booker Prize winners
British Nobel laureates
Commanders of the Order of the British Empire
English dramatists and playwrights
English historical novelists
English Nobel laureates
James Tait Black Memorial Prize recipients
Knights Bachelor
Nobel laureates in Literature
People from Marlborough, Wiltshire
People from Newquay
Royal Navy personnel of World War II
Royal Navy sailors
Schoolteachers from Wiltshire
Writers from Cornwall
Writers of fiction set in prehistoric times
Writers of historical fiction set in the Middle Ages